The Men of Angelos ( Mardān-e Ānjelos), also known as The Companions of the Cave ( Ashāb-e Kahf), is a 1997 Iranian television series directed by Farajollah Salahshoor. It depicts the story of the Seven Sleepers (mentioned in Surah al-Kahf), according to the Quran.

Cast 
 Jafar Dehghan — Maximilian
 Mahtab Keramati — Helen
 Jahanbakhsh Soltani — Decius
 Hossein Yari — Julius
 Reza Tavakkoli — Antonius
 Ardalan Shoja Kaveh — Adonia
 Reza Iranmanesh — Ioannis
 Majid Moshiri — Matius
 Yousef Moradian — Martinus
 Esrafil Alamdari — Sodinanus
 Reza Iranmanesh — Juvanis
 Mohammad Poursattar – Arius

Music 
 Prologue (3:24)
 Lady Helen (2:11)
 Byzantine, Philadelphia (2:47)
 Plutonius (3:03)
 Maximilian (4:51)
 Adonijah (2:56)
 Looking for Maximilian (2:14)
 Christian Blood (2:39)
 Lady Helen (Reprise) (1:28)
 The Bandits (3:40)
 Julius and Maximilian (2:58)
 End of the Road (2:20)
 Hiding Place (3:31)
 Ambush (0:58)
 The Emperor (6:39)
 Hymn (2:01)
 Celebration (2:17)
 Haleluja (My God, the God of Jesus) (0:54)
 Incapable Idols (3:36)
 Surrounding (5:27)
 A Friend (3:18)
 A Sacrifice for Apollo (4:41)
 Crucifixion (2:35)
 The Revelation (1:49)
 The Companions of the Cave (2:13)
 Fright (1:58)
 The End (3:20)
 Toward Welcoming The Men of God (6:09)
 In Memory of Helen (2:31)
 Reception (2:18)
 Decius (1:41)
 The Desicion (1:17)
 In Memory of Mother (5:32)
 Penitence (2:46)
 Searching for Escapees (4:14)
 Tunnel (2:24)
 Detecting the Christians (2:50)
 Capturing Christians (2:14)
 Footprint (1:51)
 Informer (1:47)
 Assassination (3:02)
 Thought (0:47)
 Adonijah (Alternate Version) (2:56)
 Lady Helen (Alternate Version) (2:10)
 My God, the God of Jesus (Reprise) (0:51)
 The Desicion (Alternate Version) (1:17)
 Toward Welcoming Men of God (Reprise) (3:05)

See also
 List of Islamic films

References

External links 
 

Television series about Islam
Persian-language films
1998 Iranian television series debuts
Films set in the Roman Empire
Roman Anatolia
Films about Christianity
Films based on the Quran
Iranian drama films
Iranian historical films